Sangtu (also Romanized as Sangtū) is a village in Kheyrud Kenar Rural District, in the Central District of Nowshahr County, Mazandaran Province, Iran. At the 2006 census, its population was 268, in 69 families.

References 

Populated places in Nowshahr County